Hossein Sabet Baktash (born 1934 in Mashhad) is an Iranian businessman and Persian carpet dealer. Sabet has a BSc in engineering and resides in Berlin, Germany.

In 1970 he has founded a Hotelkomplex Stella Canarias, located in Jandia on the island Fuerteventura. Stella Canaris was sold in 2000 to the Spanish Hotel Group Dunas. After Dunas declared insolvency Sabet took over the management in 2010. After unpaid bills the Hotel shut down from 2013 to 2016.

In 1981 Sabet bought the Berlin newspaper Der Abend.

Hossein Sabet was the Architect and owner of the Dariush Grand Hotel. The Project included a Dolphin Park and Birds Garden in Kish Island. In 2014 Sabet sold the Project to Seyed Abdoulreza Mousavi.

References

Iranian businesspeople
Iranian emigrants to Germany
People from Mashhad
Hoteliers
Living people
1934 births